The 1997 Michigan State Spartans football team competed on behalf of Michigan State University as a member of the Big Ten Conference during the 1997 Big Ten Conference football season. Led by third-year head coach Nick Saban, the Spartans compiled an overall record of 7–5 with a mark of 4–4 in conference play, tying for sixth place in the Big Ten. Michigan State was invited to the Aloha Bowl, where they lost, 51–23, on December 25 to Washington. The team played home games at Spartan Stadium in East Lansing, Michigan.

Schedule

Game summaries

Notre Dame

    
    
    
    
    
    

Michigan State's first win versus Notre Dame since 1986.

Coaching staff
 Nick Saban, head coach
 Gary Tranquill , offensive coordinator, quarterbacks coach
 Bobby Williams, running backs coach
 Charlie Baggett, wide receivers coach
 Pat Shurmur, tight ends coach, special teams coordinator
 Jim Bollman, offensive line coach
 Dean Pees, defensive coordinator, inside linebackers coach
 Todd Grantham, defensive line coach
 Mark Dantonio, defensive backs coach
 Greg Colby, defensive assistant

1998 NFL Draft
The following players were selected in the 1998 NFL Draft.

References

Michigan State
Michigan State Spartans football seasons
Michigan State Spartans football